The 2016 ITF Women's Circuit – Shenzhen Longhua was a professional tennis tournament played on outdoor hard courts. It was the 1st edition of the tournament and part of the 2016 ITF Women's Circuit, offering a total of $100,000 in prize money. It took place in Shenzhen, China, on 14–20 November 2016.

Singles main draw entrants

Seeds 

 1 Rankings as of 7 November 2016.

Other entrants 
The following player received a wildcard into the singles main draw:
  Liang Chen
  Wang Xinyu
  Wang Xiyu
  Xu Yifan

The following players received entry from the qualifying draw:
  Guo Hanyu
  Sun Ziyue
  Tang Haochen
  Zuzana Zlochová

The following player received entry by a protected ranking:
  Tereza Mrdeža

Champions

Women's singles

 Peng Shuai def.  Patricia Maria Țig, 3–6, 7–5, 6–4

Women's doubles

 Nina Stojanović /  You Xiaodi def.  Han Xinyun /  Zhu Lin, 6–4, 7–6(8–6)

External links 
 2016 ITF Women's Circuit – Shenzhen Longhua at ITFtennis.com
 Official website

2016 ITF Women's Circuit
2016 in Chinese tennis
Shenzhen Longhua Open